"A Cream Cracker Under The Settee" is a dramatic monologue written by Alan Bennett in 1987 for television, as part of his Talking Heads  series for the BBC. The series became very popular, moving onto BBC Radio, international theatre, becoming one of the best-selling audio book releases of all time and included as part of both the A-level and GCSE English syllabus. It was the sixth and final episode of the first series of Talking Heads.

Storyline 

"A Cream Cracker under the Settee" is played out as a monologue by Doris (Thora Hird), a seventy-five-year-old woman who is a widow, following her slip off a pouffe (pronounced 'buffet' in the play). Her disapproval of home-helper Zulema's cleaning leads her to attempt to clean a picture of her and Wilfred, her late husband, and subsequently her fall. Her position, now suffering from a "numby" leg, prompts her natural desire to find help. Thus she moves from her place on a chair, to the floor near where she fell, and finally to the front door of her house.

An exhausted Doris drags herself back to the living room after failing to get help from the front door. Eventually she hears the voice of a policeman, asking if she is all right because - unusually - her lights are off. Instead of asking for his help, she lets him leave, after telling him she was napping. It is assumed by the situation, and by the fact that the conclusions to Bennett's plays are typically bleak, that Doris later dies. Throughout the monologue, she discusses past issues and events in her life, as well as recalling characters and situations. The juxtaposition of humour and sadness is used frequently by Bennett, as it is in many of the Talking Heads monologues to great effect. Such effects include the interaction of passing time.

The televised monologue gives the impression of a dark evening as the end of her life is suggested; the passing of time reflecting the passing of her life. Furthermore, the moving from the relatively comfy position of her chair - where she is sitting at the start - possibly indicates the movement from a secure and comfy position in life to her current situation. Issues such as treatment of the aged, growing old and life choices are frequently discussed throughout the monologue.

Reception
The episode was well received and picked up three nominations at the 1989 BAFTA Awards. Thora Hird won the award for Best Actress ahead of two other actresses from Talking Heads episodes, Patricia Routledge (A Lady of Letters) and Maggie Smith (Bed Among the Lentils). It was also nominated for Best Drama Series and Best Video Lighting.

See also 
 English A-level and GCSEs

References

External links
 Episode guide

BBC television dramas
British plays
BBC Radio 7 (rebranded) programmes